The Arini tribe of the neotropical parrots is a monophyletic clade of macaws and parakeets (commonly called conures in aviculture) characterized by colorful plumage and long, tapering tails.  They occur throughout Mexico, Central America, and South America, and formerly the Caribbean and North America.  One genus and several species are extinct; another genus is extinct in the wild.  Two species are known only through subfossil remains.  About a dozen hypothetical extinct species (see Extinct Caribbean macaws) have been described, native to the Caribbean area. 
Among the Arini are some of the rarest birds in the world, such as Spix's macaw, which is extinct in the wild – fewer than 100 specimens survive in captivity.  It also contains the largest flighted parrot in the world, the hyacinth macaw. Some species, such as the blue-and-yellow macaw and sun conure are popular pet parrots.

Molecular studies have dated the divergence of the Arini tribe from the ancestral neotropical parrots to late in the Paleogene period about 30–35 million years ago.

Taxonomy
The Arini are one of three recognized clades in subfamily Arinae of neotropical parrots in the family Psittacidae of Afrotropical and neotropical parrots, one of three families of true parrots.

See also
List of parrots
List of macaws
List of Aratinga parakeets

References

 
Psittacidae
Bird tribes

Taxa named by George Robert Gray
Higher-level bird taxa restricted to the Neotropics